U.S. Bicycle Route 1 (often called U.S. Bike Route 1, abbreviated USBR 1) is a cross-country bicycle route that will run the length of the United States eastern seaboard from Florida to Maine. It is one of the two original U.S. Bicycle Routes, the other being U.S. Bicycle Route 76.

AASHTO recognizes the segments in Florida, Georgia, North Carolina, Virginia, Maryland, Massachusetts, New Hampshire, and Maine as being the only "official" segments of USBR 1. The other segments, even if signed or mapped, have not yet been submitted by the states to AASHTO for formal inclusion or recognition in the U.S. Bicycle Route system. The New Hampshire and Maine sections of USBR 1 were approved in May 2011, with the New Hampshire section following the East Coast Greenway. Also approved was an alternate route, U.S. Bicycle Route 1A, that runs closer to the coast through a portion of Maine.  Florida and Massachusetts segments were established in November 2014.  Georgia's segment was designated in May 2019.

In Georgia, State Bicycle Route 95 is planned to be incorporated into USBR 1.

Route description

|-
| FL
| 
|-
| GA
| 
|-
| NC
| 
|-
| VA
| 
|-
| DC
| 
|-
| MD
| 
|-
| MA
| 
|-
| NH
| 
|-
| ME
| 
|- class="sortbottom"
! scope="row" | Total || 
|}

Communities
The following communities are serviced by the route:

Florida

 Key West
 Jacksonville

Georgia

 Effingham County
 Chatham County
 Liberty County
 McIntosh County
 Glynn County
 Camden County
 Charlton County

North Carolina

 Laurinburg
 Southern Pines
 Sanford
 Apex
 Cary
 Raleigh
 Oxford
 Henderson

Virginia

 John H. Kerr Dam
 Victoria
 Burkeville
 Richmond
 Ashland
 Fredericksburg
 Chatham Heights
 Leeland
 Tacketts Mill
 Aden
 Springfield
 Occoquan
 Lorton
 Fort Belvoir
 Mount Vernon
 Alexandria
 Arlington

Massachusetts

 Boston
 Malden

New Hampshire

 Portsmouth

Maine

 Portland
 Augusta
 Bangor
 Calais

U.S. Bicycle Route 1A

U.S. Bicycle Route 1A is an alternate route to USBR 1 in Maine, following the Atlantic coast between Brunswick and Bucksport.

See also
 East Coast Greenway

References

External links

 Explore Maine by Bike - has a map book of USBR 1 through Maine

01
Bike paths in North Carolina
Bike paths in Virginia
Bike paths in New Hampshire
Bike paths in Maine
Bike paths in Washington, D.C.
Transportation in Scotland County, North Carolina
Transportation in Hoke County, North Carolina
Transportation in Moore County, North Carolina
Transportation in Lee County, North Carolina
Transportation in Chatham County, North Carolina
Transportation in Wake County, North Carolina
Transportation in Granville County, North Carolina
Transportation in Vance County, North Carolina
Transportation in Warren County, North Carolina